Nancy Paine Stoll (born August 25, 1947), known professionally as Mink Stole, is an American actress from Baltimore, Maryland. She began her career working for director John Waters, and has appeared in all of his feature films to date (a distinction shared only with Mary Vivian Pearce). Her extensive work with Waters has made her one of the Dreamlanders, Waters' ensemble of regular cast and crew members.

Biography
She was born into a large Roman Catholic family, and has nine siblings, including children's-book author Ellen Stoll Walsh and sculptor George Stoll. Her father, Joseph A. Stoll, died in 1955, and her mother, Nell, remarried twice, resulting in an extensive step-family.

Stole has performed in most of the films by close friend John Waters. Her film career began as a party guest in Waters' film Roman Candles. Since then, she has appeared in all of his feature films up to and including 2004's A Dirty Shame. The only Waters films in which she does not appear are the early short films Hag in a Black Leather Jacket, Eat Your Makeup, and The Diane Linkletter Story. She has appeared in a number of films and television shows, and wrote a column for the Baltimore City Paper titled "Think Mink" until mid-April 2006. She is the lead singer of Mink Stole and Her Wonderful Band, of which musicians Kristian Hoffman, George Baby Woods, and Brian Grillo have been members. The Baltimore incarnation of Mink Stole and Her Wonderful Band (2009–present) includes Scott Wallace Brown (piano, organ), Walker Teret (upright bass, guitar), Skizz Cyzyk (drums), and John Irvine (trumpet).

In 1999, Stole appeared in the satirical lesbian film But I'm A Cheerleader alongside Natasha Lyonne in the role of Megan's mother. In April 2009, Stole connected with cult director Steve Balderson for Stuck!, an homage to film noir women in prison dramas. Co-starring Karen Black, Pleasant Gehman and Jane Wiedlin, Stuck! was filmed in Macon, Georgia. Stole played Esther, a religious inmate sentenced to death. She once again co-starred with Natasha Lyonne in Joshua Grannell's All About Evil.

She received a Lifetime Achievement Award at the 2010 Boston Underground Film Festival in Cambridge following the East Coast Premiere of Stuck! on March 27, 2010. In 2011 she successfully completed a Kickstarter fundraising project to finance her first CD, titled Do Re MiNK. The CD was released on May 23, 2013.

Personal life
Mink Stole lives in Baltimore, and also has a second home in the Los Angeles area. She performs weddings as an ordained minister of the Universal Life Church.

Filmography

Film

Television

References

External links
 
 
 The Evening Class: Mink Stole

American film actresses
American television actresses
American women singers
Living people
Actresses from Baltimore
Musicians from Baltimore
Singers from Maryland
Former Roman Catholics
Universal Life Church
1947 births
21st-century American women